Paula Usero García (born 22 October 1991) is a Spanish actress, best known for her roles in the 2020 comedy film Rosa's Wedding and the television series Love Is Forever.

Filmography

Film

Television

References

External links

1991 births
Living people
Spanish film actresses
People from Valencia